Jean Charles Biaudet (19 February 1910 - 7 August 2000) was a historian, director of the Cantonal and University Library of Lausanne (Bibliothèque cantonale et universitaire de Lausanne, BCU) and teacher at the University of Lausanne.

Early life 

Jean Charles Biaudet was born in Territet, Montreux, Switzerland on 19 February 1910. He grew up in Algeria and Paris. He conducted his university studies in Lausanne and obtained his degree in political science in 1936, and his doctorate in letters in 1940. In 1943, he was appointed archivist at the Vaud Cantonal Archives, replacing Louis Junod. He was then promoted to director.

Professional background

In 1945, Biaudet became a lecturer in n the history of contemporary Switzerland. He became professor of modern and contemporary history in 1955. In 1950, he took over the management of the cantonal and university library. Biaudet spent five years at BCU. He had the chance to see the library expand into a large space. From the expansion to the adjacent premises, the space was remodeled to increase the bookstores by ten kilometers and a reading room with 100 seats. It was under his direction that it received one of the most important donations, the library of the Italian Marquis residing in Lausanne Giuseppe d'Ayala-Valva (1871-1951), or approximately  works of letters, fine arts, and history.

Biaudet was Vice-rector of the University of Lausanne from 1969 to 1972. He worked in numerous committees and institutions. He was editor of the Swiss History Review (1949-1963), a member of Pro Helvetia (1959-1963), Scientific Research Council (1964-1976), International Committee of Historical Sciences (1967-1980), and President of the Vaudois History and Archeology Society (1947-1949), 1957-1959).

When Biaudet retired in 1980, he worked with Marie-Claude Jéquier, who was his assistant for more than ten years, he published in three volumes (1983, 1993, and 1998), the correspondence of Frédéric César de La Harpe under the Helvetic Republic. The third volume appeared at the bicentenary of the Vaud Revolution.

Biaudet published with Françoise Nicod, three other volumes (1978, 1979 and 1980) of his correspondence between La Harpe, the tsar Alexander I of Russia and the imperial family of Russia. He published the History of Lausanne in 1982, and volume XII, of the Encyclopédie du Canton de Vaud, La Bibliographie Vaudoise in 1993.

Death
As municipal councilor of Chexbres (1965-1977) and honorary Bourgeoisie of Chexbres, Jean Charles Biaudet died on 7 August 2000, at the age of 90, in Cully, Switzerland.

Publications
 La Suisse et la monarchie de juillet, 1830-1838 (1941)
 Georges Boisot et la Révolution vaudoise de 1798: quatre chapitres des "Mémoires" inédits du chancelier Boisot (1948)
 Les origines de la Constitution fédérale de 1848 (1949)
 La Cathédrale de Lausanne (1975)
 Bibliographie Vaudoise (1987)
 Histoire de Lausanne (1982)
 Correspondance de Frédéric-César de La Harpe sous la République Helvétique (1982)

See also

Culture of Switzerland
Georges Boisot

References

External links 
 Jean-Charles Biaudet (biography)
 Jean Charles Biaudet (biography)

1910 births
2000 deaths
People from the canton of Vaud